Nembrotha mullineri is a species of colourful sea slug, a dorid nudibranch, a marine gastropod mollusk in the family Polyceridae. It was first described in 1997.

Distribution
This species is known only from the Philippines.

Description
Nembrotha mullineri is a white-black nembrothid that grows to at least 50 mm in length. The body is creamy-white, with longitudinal black-brown lines. The rhinophores and gills are black.

Ecology
Nembrotha mullineri eats colonial ascidians.

References

Polyceridae
Gastropods described in 1997